Alfred Seifert (6 September 1850 Praskolesy, Bohemia – 6 February 1901, Munich, Germany), born in present-day Czech Republic. Seifert was a Czech-German painter, acclaimed for his female portraits.

History 
He was born in Praskolesy (present-day Czech Republic), but within a few months, his family moved to nearby Hořovice. As a child, he fell seriously ill, could not walk for four years and spent two years in an orthopedic institution. Instead of playing, he began to draw pictures and his artistic talent soon started to emerge. His first teachers were Karl Würbs, inspector of the Estates Gallery at Prague Castle, and Alois Kirnig, a landscape painter. After two years of studies at a high school in Malá Strana (Lesser Town of Prague), he received an admission to the Academy of Fine Arts in Munich in 1869. In 1876, he opened his own workshop there.

Seifert focused on portraits of women, especially on sentimentally mooded heads of girls which became known as "Seifert type". Critics appreciated a well-thought composition of paintings, attention to detail, as well as harmonic colors and a pleasant atmosphere.

Seifert spent most of his life in Germany. In native Bohemia, he was personally almost unknown, though he had exhibitions in Prague and black-and-white reproductions of his works regularly appeared in Světozor magazine. Some Czechs criticized his lack of patriotism by pointing out on his preference for foreign topics over domestic ones. His approach, however, was explained by financial reality: to make his living, he had to create such paintings that his Munich audience was willing to buy. In Bohemia, his works did not sell well, even if he accommodated. For example, a history painting Jan Augusta welcomes Filipina Welser waited long for a buyer. To a church in Hořovice, he donated his painting Ave Maria, depicting a young girl praying to Virgin Mary.

His other famous works include: Ophelia, Titania, Walk out of the gate, Spring of love and Tales of spooks.

Gallery

References

Czech painters
Czech male painters
19th-century German painters
German male painters
1850 births
1901 deaths
Academy of Fine Arts, Munich alumni
19th-century German male artists
Austro-Hungarian emigrants to Germany
People from Beroun District
German Bohemian people